Felix Herzenbruch (born 8 August 1992) is a German professional footballer who plays as a centre-back or left-back for Rot-Weiss Essen.

Career
Herzenbruch made his professional debut for SC Paderborn in the first round of the DFB-Pokal against 2. Bundesliga club SV Sandhausen on 22 August 2016, losing 2–1.

References

External links
 
 

Living people
1992 births
Sportspeople from Wuppertal
German footballers
Footballers from North Rhine-Westphalia
Association football defenders
2. Bundesliga players
3. Liga players
Regionalliga players
Wuppertaler SV players
Rot-Weiß Oberhausen players
SC Paderborn 07 players
Rot-Weiss Essen players